Laurel Homes Historic District is a registered historic district in Cincinnati, Ohio, listed in the National Register of Historic Places on May 19, 1987.  It contained 29 contributing buildings.

All but three of the historic low-income public housing projects was razed between 2000–02 to make way for new condominiums.

History

Laurel Homes was established in 1938 with 1303 units of low income housing. An adjacent property of 1015 units, Lincoln Court, opened in 1942 to black families only. Apartments at Laurel Homes were leased to both white and to lesser degree, black, families, making it nominally one of the first integrated housing projects in the United States.

Laurel Homes was the second largest Public Works Administration public housing project in the country.

See also 
 Woolworth Building in Lexington, Kentucky by the same architect, Frederick W. Garber.
 National Register of Historic Places listings in Cincinnati, Ohio

References

External links 

Library of Congress Prints & Photographs Online Catalog: Laurel Homes Building B 

Library of Congress Prints & Photographs Online Catalog: Laurel Homes Historic District 

Historic districts in Cincinnati
Frederick W. Garber buildings
Public housing in the United States
Houses completed in 1938
National Register of Historic Places in Hamilton County, Ohio
Historic districts on the National Register of Historic Places in Ohio
West End, Cincinnati
Public Works Administration in Ohio